Vijaya Rajadhyaksha (born 1933) is a Marathi writer from Maharashtra, India.

She studied at Rajaram College in Kolhapur, and obtained her doctorate from Mumbai University.

Rajadhyaksha taught Marathi literature at Elphinstone College affiliated with Mumbai University, and then served as the head of Marathi department in SNDT Women's University, also in Mumbai.

Her book  received a Sahitya Akademi Award in 1993. She presided over Marathi Sahitya Sammelan at Indore in 2001. Recently, she was awarded first Vinda Karandikar Jeevan Gaurav Puraskar (2010) which carries a prize money of Rs 1,00,000/- and an honorary certificate.

Her husband M.V. Rajadhyaksha (1913-2010) was also a noted Marathi writer.

Literary Work

Critiques

Collections of short stories

Collections of essays

Novel

Play

Literature for children

Edited collections of works of Marathi poets

Other works

References

 
  (February 2007)

1933 births
Marathi-language writers
Living people
Presidents of the Akhil Bharatiya Marathi Sahitya Sammelan
Recipients of the Sahitya Akademi Award in Marathi